The , or nicknamed Nadeshiko Japan (なでしこジャパン), represents Japan in women's association football and is run by the Japan Football Association (JFA). It is the most successful women's national team from the Asian Football Confederation. Its highest ranking in the FIFA Women's World Rankings is 3rd, achieved in December 2011.

Nadeshiko Japan defeated the United States in the 2011 FIFA Women's World Cup Final, thus claiming their first FIFA Women's World Cup title, becoming the first Asian team to do so and only the fourth women's world champions. It won silver medals at the 2012 Summer Olympics and the 2015 FIFA Women's World Cup, making it the only Asian team to have three combined medals from international championships. It also won gold medals at the 2014 and 2018 AFC Women's Asian Cups, the 2010 and 2018 Asian Games, and the 2008, 2010, and 2019 EAFF Football Championships.

History

1970s and 1980s
During the 1970s, the number of women football players and teams increased in Japan, and teams made up regional leagues in various parts of Japan. In 1977, the Japan team participated its first international tournament, 1977 AFC Women's Championship. But, this Japan team was not a national team, Japan Football Association dispatched club team, FC Jinnan as a Japan team. In 1980, "All-Japan Women's Football Championship" was held. In 1981, Japan Football Association formed first national team for 1981 AFC Women's Championship and Seiki Ichihara managed as first Japan national team manager. The first match against Chinese Taipei on 7 June at this tournament is the first match for Japan national team history. In 1984, national team was formed for the first time in three years for a China expedition, and Takao Orii managed national team.

In January 1986, Ryohei Suzuki became first full-time manager for national team. In December, Japan won the 2nd place at 1986 AFC Women's Championship. In 1989, the "Japan Women's Football League" (abbreviated to "L. League") was established, and the women's national team qualified for the "1991 FIFA Women's World Cup" in China.

Verge of decline
Japan women's national football team attended various championship tournaments such as the 1996 Summer Olympics and the 1995 FIFA Women's World Cup which had made the national team and the L.League very popular. However, in 1999, Japan failed to qualify for the 2000 Summer Olympics, and this helped to cause with economic stagnation (Lost Decade) the withdrawal of a series of teams from the L. League. Japanese women's football was on the verge of decline.

Regeneration
In August 2002, the Japan Football Association appointed Eiji Ueda, who had been coach for the Macau national football team, as the new head coach. Officials expected a revitalization of women's football and planned a team reorganization, aiming for the 2004 Summer Olympics. The team at first went through a losing streak, but Ueda gradually improved the team, and it eventually gained wide support in Japan. In particular, a game against Korea DPR, which decided who would participate in the 2004 Olympics, not only made fans rush to the National Stadium but also was widely watched on TV.

Following the increase in public interest in women's football in Japan, the JFA organized a public contest to select a nickname for the team. "Nadeshiko Japan" was chosen from among about 2,700 entries and was announced on 7 July 2004. "Nadeshiko", a kind of dianthus, comes from the phrase "Yamato Nadeshiko" (大和撫子, "ideal Japanese woman").

2003 and 2007 World Cup
Japan was dropped with Germany, Canada and Argentina during 2003 FIFA Women's World Cup. Beginning by a 6–0 thrash to newcomer Argentina, but later Japan fell on 0–3 loss to later champion Germany, and 1–3 to Canada, who later won 4th place.

Again, in 2007 FIFA Women's World Cup held in China, they again faced Germany, Argentina and England. They started with a 2–2 draw over England, before beating Argentina 1–0 after 90'. But a 0–2 loss over reigning champion Germany again eliminated Japan from the group stage. Japan's disappointing campaign through two decisive Women's World Cup would not have expected to lead to a 2011 triumph.

Golden Period

2011 World Cup

Japan qualified for the finals by finishing third in the 2010 AFC Women's Asian Cup. After finishing second in their group behind England, Japan beat two-time defending champion and host nation Germany 1–0 in the quarterfinals, before easily defeating Sweden 3–1 to reach the final.

After the final game finished 2–2 after extra time, Japan beat the United States 3–1 in a penalty shootout, becoming the first Asian team to win the FIFA Women's World Cup, and the first Asian team to win a senior FIFA title. It came right after men's team won the 2011 AFC Asian Cup, marked their most successful year in Japanese football.

2012 Summer Olympics
Japan qualified for the 2012 Summer Olympics by finishing first in the Asian qualifier in September 2011, only 6 weeks after winning the Women's World Cup. At the Olympics, after finishing second in their group behind Sweden, Nadeshiko Japan defeated Brazil 2–0 in the quarterfinals, followed by a 2–1 victory over France, whom Nadeshiko had lost to in a friendly match right before the Olympics, to reach the final.

In a rematch of the World Cup final, Japan was defeated in the Olympic final by a score of 1–2 against the United States, allowing two goals to Carli Lloyd in the 8th and 54th minutes. Yūki Ōgimi scored the lone goal for Japan.

2014 Asian Cup
Despite having won a FIFA Women's World Cup in 2011, Japan entered the 2014 Asian Cup having never previously won the tournament. They were drawn with Asia's Queen Australia, host Vietnam and newcomer Jordan. Their first match in the group stage of the tournament resulted in a 2–2 draw against the defending champion Australia. Also in the group stage, Japan upset host Vietnam by a 4–0 win before defeating Jordan with a 7–0 win to finish first with a higher goal difference.

In the semi-final, Japan beat eight-time champions China 2–1 after 120'. In the final, they met Australia once again and successfully earned a 1–0 win with Azusa Iwashimizu's goal. This marked the first time for Japan to become "Queen of Asia". They became the first Asian team to subsequently win both the FIFA Women's World Cup and AFC Women's Asian Cup. Because of their top placement in the tournament, Japan, Australia, China, South Korea and newcomer Thailand secured their spot at the 2015 FIFA Women's World Cup to be played in Canada the following year.

2015 World Cup

Japan, then fourth in the world, was drawn into Group C for the 2015 FIFA Women's World Cup, with tournament debutants Ecuador, Switzerland, and Cameroon. Japan won all three games, securing passage into the Round of 16, where they drew yet another tournament debutant in the Netherlands. Saori Ariyoshi and Mizuho Sakaguchi scored goals for Japan, and they ultimately survived a couple of nervy moments to get into the quarterfinals. Against Australia, Japan once again used their technical possession game to frustrate The Matildas and negate their speed. Mana Iwabuchi notched the only goal of the game three minutes from time to send Japan to the semifinals.

Against England in the semifinals, Nadeshiko Japan was able to survive against the tenacious Lionesses, as the two teams traded goals from the penalty spot (Aya Miyama for Japan, Fara Williams for England). Deadlocked from the 40th minute on, Japan got a truly fortunate break as English centre back Laura Bassett, in trying to clear out a Japan cross, ended up scoring an own-goal at the death. This set up a rematch with the United States from the 2011 Women's World Cup.

Unfortunately for Japan, the Americans came out flying and scored four goals in the first 16 minutes of the match, with American midfielder Carli Lloyd scoring a hat trick in the process. Yuki Ogimi brought Japan one back in the 27th minute, and an own goal from Julie Johnston halved the American lead, but Tobin Heath put the final touch on the United States' third Women's World Cup victory.

Team image

Nicknames
The Japan women's national football team has been known or nicknamed as the "Nadeshiko Japan".

Home stadium

Japan play its home matches among various stadiums, in rotation, around the country.

Rivalries

South Korea

The Japan and South Korea national football teams are sporting rivals.

Australia

The Japan and Australia national soccer teams are AFC's rivals.

United States

The Japan and United States are sporting rivals.

FIFA World Ranking
, after the match against .

 Best Ranking   Best Mover   Worst Ranking   Worst Mover

Overall competitive record
 All results list Japan goal tally first.
 Goal scorers are sorted alphabetically.
 Colors gold, silver, and bronze indicate first-, second-, and third-place finishes.

Overall record 

source:

Results and fixtures

The following is a list of match results in the last 12 months, as well as any future matches that have been scheduled.
Historical results (2010–present) – JFA.jp

Legend

2022

Fixtures & Results (women's senior 2022), JFA.jp

2023

Fixtures & Results (women's senior 2023), JFA.jp

All-time results
 The following table shows Japan women's all-time international record, correct as of 1 Jan 2021.

 Source: Worldfootball.net

Head-to-head record
, after the match against .

Coaching staff

Current coaching staff

Players & Staffs, JFA.jp

Manager history

, after the match against .

Players

Current squad
The following 23 players were named to the squad for the 2023 SheBelieves Cup.

Caps and goals are correct as of 15 November 2022 after match against .

(Players are listed within position group by order of kit number, seniority, caps, goals, and then alphabetically)

Recent call-ups
The following players have been named to the squad in the past 12 months.

(Players are listed within position group by order of latest call-up, caps, goals, and then alphabetically)

Players & Staffs, JFA.jp

Previous squads
Bold indicates winning squads

FIFA Women's World Cup
1991 FIFA Women's World Cup
1995 FIFA Women's World Cup
1999 FIFA Women's World Cup
2003 FIFA Women's World Cup
2007 FIFA Women's World Cup
2011 FIFA Women's World Cup
2015 FIFA Women's World Cup
2019 FIFA Women's World Cup
Olympic Games
1996 Summer Olympics
2004 Summer Olympics
2008 Summer Olympics
2012 Summer Olympics
2016 Summer Olympics
2020 Summer Olympics

AFC Women's Asian Cup
2014 Women's AFC Asian Cup
2018 Women's AFC Asian Cup
2022 Women's AFC Asian Cup
Asian Games
1990 Asian Games
1994 Asian Games
1998 Asian Games
2002 Asian Games
2006 Asian Games
2010 Asian Games
2014 Asian Games
2018 Asian Games

EAFF E-1 Football Championship
2015 EAFF Women's East Asian Cup
2017 EAFF E-1 Football Championship
2019 EAFF E-1 Football Championship

Captains

Bold indicates current captain
 Yumi Obe (?–2004)
 Hiromi Ikeda (2004–2008)
 Homare Sawa (2008–2012)
 Aya Miyama (2012–2016)
 Saki Kumagai (2016–present)

Records

*Players in bold are still active, at least at club level.

Most capped players

Top goalscorers

Honours

Intercontinental
FIFA Women's World Cup
  Champions: 2011
  Runners-up: 2015
Olympic Games
  Runners-up: 2012

Continental
AFC Women's Asian Cup
  Champions: 2014, 2018
  Runners-up: 1986, 1991, 1995, 2001
Asian Games
  Champions: 2010, 2018
  Runners-up: 1990, 1994, 2006, 2014

Regional
EAFF E-1 Football Championship
  Champions: 2008, 2010, 2019, 2022
  Runners-up: 2013, 2017

Other tournaments
Algarve Cup
  Runners-up: 2012, 2014

Competitive record
 Champions   Runners-up   Third place   Fourth place

FIFA Women's World Cup

*Draws include knockout matches decided on penalty kicks.

Olympic Games

*Draws include knockout matches decided on penalty kicks.

AFC Women's Asian Cup

*Draws include knockout matches decided on penalty kicks.
 A Japanese representative side FC Jinnan representing Japan participated in the 1977 AFC Women's Championship.

Asian Games

*Draws include knockout matches decided on penalty kicks.

EAFF E-1 Football Championship

*Draws include knockout matches decided on penalty kicks.

Algarve Cup
The Algarve Cup is an invitational tournament for national teams in women's association football hosted by the Portuguese Football Federation (FPF). Held annually in the Algarve region of Portugal since 1994, it is one of the most prestigious and longest-running women's international football events and has been nicknamed the "Mini FIFA Women's World Cup."

Cyprus Women's Cup

SheBelieves Cup
The SheBelieves Cup is a global invitational tournament for national teams in women's football hosted in the United States.

Tournament of Nations
The Tournament of Nations was a global invitational tournament for national teams in women's soccer in non-World Cup and non-Olympic years hosted by the United States Soccer Federation (USSF) in several American cities. The inaugural tournament was held in 2017.

The 2021 edition would have been a pre-Olympics tournament due to the rescheduling of the Tokyo Olympics. On May 6, 2021, however, the USSF announced that it would no longer hold Tournament of Nations because recent changes in international windows by FIFA made a round-robin tournament unfeasible.

See also
National teams
Men's
Japan national football team
Japan national under-23 football team
Japan national under-20 football team
Japan national under-17 football team
Japan national futsal team
Japan national under-20 futsal team
Japan national beach soccer team
Women's
Japan women's national under-20 football team
Japan women's national under-17 football team
Japan women's national futsal team

References

External links

 Official website at JFA.jp 
 Japan profile at FIFA.com
 Japan at FIFA.com

 
Asian women's national association football teams
FIFA Women's World Cup-winning countries
People's Honour Award winners